Zenonia 3: The Midgard Story is an action role-playing game created, developed, and published by Gamevil for Android and iOS. It was released on the App Store on April 28, 2011, on Google Play on July 1, 2011, and on the Amazon Appstore on April 1, 2012. On the App Store, Zenonia 3 is distributed as a premium and freemium title, whereas on Google Play and the Amazon Appstore, it is distributed as a freemium-only title. It is the sequel to Gamevil's earlier releases Zenonia and Zenonia 2.

Gameplay 
Like the earlier games in the Zenonia series, this game features real time combat and exploration. The main character, Chael, is controlled through use of an on-screen d-pad. There are side quests that the player can choose to complete in order to further explore the world. Chael can choose one of four available classes. The Sword Knight and Shadow Hunter are both melee-type characters. The Mechanic Launcher and Nature Shaman use ranged weapons in combat.

Execution Room
New to the Zenonia series, the Execution Room is a Colosseum-style tournament against in-game monsters. The user can choose to battle the monsters alone or use their device to control their friend's character and face the challenge with a non-player character (NPC) by their side. This is called Asynchronous co-op gameplay. The Execution Room is available to the user after reaching the town of Delfoy.

Synopsis 
Chael, the adopted son of the first Zenonia game's protagonist Regret, tries to find his way home after being transported against his will into another dimension, called Midgard, or the middle realm. On his quest, he is accompanied by a girl from the Divine Tribe named Celine and a sarcastic fairy named Runa.

Reception 

Zenonia 3 received praise combined with some criticism. Pocket Gamer awarded it 7 out of 10 points, praising its artwork but criticizing the gameplay as repetitive.

References

External links 
Official site
Gamevil discussion forum for Zenonia 3

Role-playing video games
Action role-playing video games
IOS games
Android (operating system) games
Video games developed in South Korea
2011 video games